Albert C. Buckenberger (January 31, 1861 – July 1, 1917) was an American manager in Major League Baseball.

Early life
Buckenberger was born in Detroit, Michigan, and began his career as an infielder, and then manager for minor league teams in the Midwest.

Major career
In 1889 he became manager of the Columbus Solons of the American Association for two seasons. 

After a year at the minor league Sioux City, Iowa Cornhuskers he joined the National League Pittsburgh Pirates from 1892 to 1894, and then the St. Louis Browns for a year. He managed the Toronto Maple Leafs, and the Syracuse Stars of the Eastern League for a year each, taking Syracuse to a first place finish in 1897. He then managed the Eastern League Rochester Bronchos from 1899 to 1901, finishing first-second-first.

Following this he rejoined the National League as manager of the Boston Beaneaters from 1902 to 1904.  He returned to Rochester between 1905 and 1908.

Al Buckenberger also served as club president at Pittsburgh. His biggest successes were finishing second in the American Association in 1890 and finishing second in the National League at Pittsburgh in 1893.

Later life
After his major league days he was part of a group, together with Francis Richter, editor of Sporting Life, and fellow manager Billy Barnie that tried and failed to resurrect the American Association.

Buckenberger died at age 56 in Syracuse, New York.

Managerial record

References

Notes

External links
 Baseball-Reference.com – career managing record
 Al Buckenberger obituary

1862 births
1917 deaths
Columbus Solons managers
Pittsburgh Pirates managers
St. Louis Browns (NL) managers
Boston Beaneaters managers
Toronto Maple Leafs (International League) managers
Ohio State League Managers
Terre Haute (minor league baseball) players
Toledo Avengers players
Kalamazoo Kazoos players
Wheeling National Citys players
Wheeling Nailers (baseball) players
Baseball players from Detroit